Enrique Javier Arce Temple (born October 8, 1972) is a Spanish television and film actor.

Biography
Arce was born in Valencia, Spain on 8 October 1972. He originally went to university to study law, but during his fourth year, he decided to move into acting. He won Ellos i Elles, a Valencian television show on Canal Nou, and used the 2 million pesetas (circa £10,000/ $15,000) prize money to pay for his studies at the American Academy of Dramatic Arts. He has developed his career in Spain and abroad.

Personal life
He was married to the actress Cristina Peña, and lived with Olympic synchronised swimmer Gemma Mengual from 2005 to 2008.

Career

Cinema

Feature films

Short films

Television

Continuous roles

Episodic roles

Theatre

References

External links 
 
Official Website 

1972 births
Living people
Spanish male film actors
Spanish male stage actors
Spanish male television actors
Male actors from the Valencian Community
20th-century Spanish male actors
21st-century Spanish male actors
American Academy of Dramatic Arts alumni